Tenson was founded 1951 by the spring entrepreneur, Paul Rydholm in Varberg, a picturesque coastal town in western Sweden. Ever since 1951 Tenson has been pioneers in designing and manufacturing functional outdoor clothing. Tenson has also developed their own technologies and material and brought many innovations to the market such as MPC Moisture Permeability Coating, mpc extreme AIR PUSH etc.

Tenson develops, market and sell products into three categories: outdoor, ski and urban. The brand is well established since the 1960s in Scandinavia, The Netherlands, Belgium, UK, Germany, Austria and Switzerland.
Some of Tenson's classic designs are Himalaya Jacket, Skagway Jacket

External links
Official Website

Clothing companies of Sweden
Outdoor clothing brands
1951 establishments in Sweden